Salisbury rail crash may refer to:

1906 Salisbury rail crash, speeding, killed 28 people 
2021 Salisbury rail crash, poor rail adhesion